Chicopee Ski & Summer Resort (formerly "Chicopee Ski Club") is a winter and summer recreation club in Kitchener, Ontario, Canada, founded Dec. 29, 1934, as a not-for-profit organisation on .

Winter sports include alpine skiing, snowboarding and a tubing park.

Summer activities include tennis, volleyball, high and low ropes courses, a  rock-climbing wall, an 18-hole disc golf course (opened May 2009), mountain bike trails and a BMX course / PINES Bridge Park.

Chicopee also offers extensive summer and winter camp programs, as well as corporate retreats with teambuilding exercises.

Runs
There are 11 runs at Chicopee.

Lifts

Chicopee uses a combination of different lifts, three are regular chairlifts and two magic carpets. The magic carpets are only used on beginner hills.

Programs
Chicopee offers a variety of winter programs available to all ages, including Snow School, Downhill Racing, and the Track-3 program.  The Chicopee Race program offers the opportunity for anyone, no matter of age, to learn how to race in the Slalom or Giant Slalom disciple.  This can be done through weekly programs, Christmas or March Break camps, or lessons.

Incidents

Kevin Loree Tobogganing Accident, 1977
Fifteen-year-old Kevin Loree died in a tobogganing accident.

Paul Thompson Accident, February 17, 2000
Skier was skiing Easy Rider when he lost control and hit a pole. He was immobilized St. Mary's hospital where he later died.

Sugar Bowl Lift Failure, December 29, 2010
Approximately 40 people were stranded on the Sugar Bowl lift and were rescued using a rope harness.

North Chair Lift Failure, January 2, 2013
An electrical fault triggered the emergency brake and left approximately 100 people stranded, who were rescued using a rope harness.

Membership and Attendance

Rates

Memberships

Tickets

See also
 List of ski areas and resorts in Canada
 Glen Eden (Ski Area) The closest ski hill to Chicopee in Milton, Ontario.
 Beaver Valley Ski Club
 Boler Mountain

References

External links
Chicopee Ski Club
Grand River Conservation Authority
Waterloo Region Track 3 Ski School

Ski areas and resorts in Ontario
Sport in Kitchener, Ontario
Sports venues in Kitchener, Ontario
Tourist attractions in the Regional Municipality of Waterloo
Geography of the Regional Municipality of Waterloo